The New Jersey Women's Hall of Fame was established in 2011, by the YWCA of Trenton, in Trenton, New Jersey.

Inductions into the hall of fame occur at the Annual Induction Gala, which is held in the Spring. Each inductee receives the Gerber Daisy Award, created in 2011 by Boehm Porcelain, of Trenton, for the hall of fame. The inaugural class was inducted on March 31, 2011.

The YWCA of Trenton—sponsor of the hall—was founded in 1904, to empower women, eliminate racism, and promote peace, justice, freedom, and dignity for everyone.

Inductees

See also
New Jersey Hall of Fame
Sports Hall of Fame of New Jersey

Footnotes

Further reading

YWCA
Women's halls of fame
Lists of American women
Halls of fame in New Jersey
History of women in New Jersey
State halls of fame in the United States
Museums in Trenton, New Jersey
Awards established in 2011
2011 establishments in New Jersey